Atoconeura aethiopica is a species of dragonfly in the family Libellulidae. It is endemic to Ethiopia. It is limited to clear mountain streams in forested habitat. This habitat type is being degraded, so the species is considered to be vulnerable.

References

Libellulidae
Insects of Ethiopia
Endemic fauna of Ethiopia
Insects described in 1958
Taxonomy articles created by Polbot